Juha-Pekka Pajuoja (born 31 March 1967, in Tampere) is a Finnish former ice hockey player and current coach. Pajuoja was the coach of the HC TPS in Liiga. He weighs 88 kg and is 178 centimeters long.

References

Finnish ice hockey players
Finnish ice hockey coaches
1967 births
Living people
Ice hockey people from Tampere

Ässät coaches